Racing Club, known as Racing Beirut or simply Racing, is a football club based in Achrafieh, a district in Beirut, Lebanon, that competes in the . They play their home matches at the Fouad Chehab Stadium and are primarily supported by the Christian community.

Racing Beirut won the Lebanese Premier League three times, the Lebanese Challenge Cup twice, and the Lebanese Second Division three times. They also finished runners-up in the Lebanese FA Cup twice.

History 
The club was founded in 1934 by several locals from the Achrafieh and Gemmayzeh districts of Beirut, Lebanon. The club's name is inspired from French football club Racing Paris, who the club's presidents supported. Racing played five years in the Lebanese Second Division, and got its first promotion to the Lebanese Premier League in 1940.

In 1953, Albert Kheir was elected as the club's president. He sought to heighten the club's status in the country, by buying 20-year-old Joseph Abou Murad from Intissar Chayyah, Said Haidar from Al Nahda, and Yuguslavian coach Ljubiša Broćić.

Racing Beirut played international friendly games against a variety of famous clubs and selections during the 1970s, including one against the Brazil national under-23 team.

Club rivalries 
Historically, during the 1960s and 1970s, Racing's main rivals were Nejmeh, also from Beirut. Racing plays the Achrafieh derby with Sagesse.

Players

Squad

Shirt manufacturers 
2008: Adidas
2009: Lotto
2010: Lotto
2011–2013: Adidas
2014–2016: Diadora
2016–2018: Joma
2018–present: Capelli

Honours

League
 Lebanese Premier League
 Winners (3): 1955–56, 1964–65, 1969–70
 Lebanese Challenge Cup
Winners (2; joint record): 2016, 2017
Lebanese Second Division
Winners (3): 1938–39, 1999–2000, 2006–07
Lebanese FA Cup
 Runners-up (2): 1944–45, 1947–48

Managerial history

 Ljubiša Broćić (1955)
 Ion Bogdan (1967–1970)
 Dorian Marin (2004–2005)
 Libor Pala (2012–2015)
 Eugen Moldovan (2015–2016)
 Moussa Hojeij (2016–2017)
 Roda Antar (2017–2019)
 Jalal Radwan (2019–2020)
 Said Jraidini (2020–2021)
 Ismail Kortam (2021–present)

See also 
 List of football clubs in Lebanon

References

 
Football clubs in Lebanon
Sport in Beirut
1934 establishments in Lebanon
Christianity in Beirut